"Mama" is a song by British electronic music group Clean Bandit featuring British singer Ellie Goulding, released as the sixth and final single from Clean Bandit's second album, What Is Love?, on 22 February 2019.

Music video
Clean Bandit also released the video on YouTube on 25 February 2019, after postponing its launch several times due to technical problems. The video stars a character who resembles Donald Trump, mocking his childhood to his adulthood when he is elected president. The band did not say whether the character is actually Trump but said they wrote a script about "a boy whose power was taken away from him as a child and he grew up determined to take that power back."

Track listing
Digital download – Tiësto's Big Room Remix
"Mama"  – 2:36

Digital download – Morgan Page Remix
"Mama"  – 2:57

Digital download – acoustic
"Mama"  – 3:06
"Mama" – 3:09

Charts

Weekly charts

Year-end charts

Certifications

Release history

References

2018 songs
2019 singles
Clean Bandit songs
Ellie Goulding songs
Atlantic Records singles
Songs written by Grace Chatto
Songs written by Jack Patterson (Clean Bandit)
Songs written by Jason Evigan
Songs written by Ellie Goulding
Parodies of Donald Trump
Songs written by Caroline Ailin
Song recordings produced by Mark Ralph (record producer)